Weathersfield Ltd v Sargent [1999] IRLR 94 is a UK labour law case concerning the scope of race discrimination.

Facts
Mrs Sargent got a job at Weathersfield, a car-hire company. She was told, "we do have a special policy regarding coloured and Asians. We have got to be careful who we hire the vehicles to. If you get a telephone call from any coloured or Asians you can usually tell them by the sound of their voice. You have to tell them that there are no vehicles available."

She was appalled, and she resigned. She claimed constructive unfair dismissal for race discrimination. The question was, although she was not herself black, was the treatment she has on grounds of race?

Judgment
It was held that she could claim. In the Race Relations Act 1976 it says, "A person discriminates against another in any circumstances relevant for the purposes of any provision of this Act if (a) on racial grounds he treats that other less favourably than he treats or would treat other persons". Although Mrs Sargent was not herself coloured or Asian, the foul conduct of the employer was still "on racial grounds".

See also
Wilson v TB Steelwork Co Ltd (ET Case no. 23662/77) A white woman won a race discrimination claim after being refused a job because her husband was black.
UK employment discrimination law
UK labour law

Notes

United Kingdom labour case law
Anti-discrimination law in the United Kingdom
Court of Appeal (England and Wales) cases
1998 in case law
1998 in British law